Mount Shaw is a mountain located in the towns of Moultonborough and Tuftonboro in Carroll County, New Hampshire, United States. It is part of the remains of an ancient volcanic ring dike.

The Ossipee ring-dike complex of central New Hampshire is a visible remnant of a 125 million year old Cretaceous stratovolcano, a member of the later White Mountain igneous province.

Mount Shaw is located within the Castle in the Clouds estate. Its north and southeast sides drain into the Lovell and Dan Hole rivers, thence into the Ossipee River, Saco River and the Gulf of Maine. The southwest side drains into the Melvin River which flows into Lake Winnipesaukee, thence into the Winnipesaukee River, Merrimack River, and into the Gulf of Maine in Massachusetts.

See also

 List of mountains of New Hampshire

References

External links
 
 "Mt. Shaw", FranklinSites.com Hiking Guide

Mountains of New Hampshire
Mountains of Carroll County, New Hampshire